Hanseniella may refer to:
 Hanseniella (myriapod), a genus of myriapods in the family Scutigerellidae
 Hanseniella (plant), a genus of plants in the family Podostemaceae